Amblyseius utricularius is a species of mite in the family Phytoseiidae.

References

utricularius
Articles created by Qbugbot
Animals described in 1994
Taxa named by Wolfgang Karg